The Jackals (French: Les chacals) is a 1917 French silent adventure film directed by André Hugon and starring André Nox, Louis Paglieri and Musidora.

Cast
 André Nox as Gervisi  
 Louis Paglieri as Higgins  
 Musidora as Dolorès Melrose  
 M. Byon as James Hampton  
 Marc Gérard as Benedictus  
  as Goldoya 
 Maggy Delval

References

Bibliography
 Rège, Philippe. Encyclopedia of French Film Directors, Volume 1. Scarecrow Press, 2009.

External links

1917 films
Films directed by André Hugon
French silent films
French black-and-white films
French adventure films
1917 adventure films
Silent adventure films
1910s French films